Gweilo or  (pronounced ) is a common Cantonese slang term for Westerners. In the absence of modifiers, it refers to white people and has a history of racially deprecatory and pejorative use. Cantonese speakers frequently use  to refer to Westerners in general use, in a non-derogatory context, although whether this type of usage is offensive (i.e., an ethnic slur) is disputed by both Cantonese and Westerners.

Etymology and history
Gwái means "ghost" or "devil", and lóu means "man" or "guy". The literal translation of gwáilóu would thus be "ghostly man" or "devil man". It is sometimes translated into English as "foreign devil". In Chinese, "ghost" can be a derogatory term used as a curse or an insult.  The term ghost has also been used to describe other ethnic groups, for example, a 17th-century writer from Canton, wrote that Africans "look like ghosts", and gwáinòu was once used to describe African slaves.

Usage
The term gwái is an adjective that can be used to express hate and deprecation, an example being the locals' expression of their hatred towards the Japanese during their occupation of Hong Kong in World War II with the same gwái. It conveys a general bad and negative feeling but is a somewhat obsolete and archaic/old-fashioned term now days and other more modern terms have largely replaced gwái for similarly negative meanings. Cantonese people sometimes call each other sēui gwái, which means bad person, though more often than not it is applied affectionately, similar to "Hey, bitch!" in English when used affectionately. Nowadays, Cantonese speakers often refer to non-Chinese people by their ethnicity.

Gwáilóu is often considered to be an acceptable generic racial term for Westerners.  Also, some members of the Hong Kong community with European ancestry (particularly those with limited or zero Cantonese fluency) are indifferent to the term, and those who believe that the best way to defang a word intended as a "slur" is to embrace it, and use gweilo to refer to non-Chinese in Hong Kong. Gwailóu has, in some instances, been recognised as simply referring to white foreigners in South East Asia and now appears on Oxford Dictionaries defined as such, although non-white foreigners are not gwáilóu. While gwáilóu is used by some Cantonese speakers in informal speech, the more polite alternative sāi yàn is now used as well, particularly if the conversation involves a non-Chinese person in order to avoid offense.

CFMT-TV in Toronto, Canada had a cooking show named Gwai Lo Cooking (1999) hosted by a Cantonese-speaking European chef, who was also the show's producer and the person who named the show. According to CFMT-TV, "Gwei Lo" was used as "a self-deprecating term of endearment". In response to some complaints, the Canadian Broadcast Standards Council ruled that:

Related terms 
Gwai is one of a number of terms to referring to non-Chinese people than can be considered controversial and potentially offensive; a list of such terms is given below:

 gwaijai for a white boy.
 gwaimui for a white girl.
 gwaipo for white woman.
 baakgwai for white people.
 haakgwai for Black people.
 sai yan for Westerners.
 yeung yan for Westerners.
 ngoigwok yan for foreign nationals.
 acha (from "acchā" meaning "good" in Hindi) for South Asians.
 molocha for South Asians.

Mandarin Chinese 

Guizi is a Mandarin Chinese slang term for foreigners, and has a long history of being used as a racially deprecating insult.
 Riben guizi or dongyang guizi – used to refer to Japanese. 
 Er guizi – used to refer to the Korean soldiers who were a part of the Japanese army during the Sino-Japanese War in World War II.
 Yang guizi or xiyang guizi – used to refer to Westerners.

However, xiaogui is a common term in Mandarin Chinese for a child. Therefore, some argue that gui in Mandarin is just a neutral word that describes something unexpected or hard to predict.

Laowai is the word most commonly used for foreigners and is a less pejorative term than guizi. Although laowai literally means "old foreigner", depending on context, "old" can be both a term of endearment and one of criticism.

See also

Bule
Chinaman
Devils on the Doorstep (Guizi lai le) by Jiang Wen 
Gweilo: Memories of a Hong Kong Childhood
Graphic pejoratives in written Chinese
Farang
Gaijin
Gringo
Guizi
 Gweilo Beer
Haole
Laowai
List of ethnic slurs
Mat Salleh
Round Eyes in the Middle Kingdom (documentary)

References

External links

  
  
  - Opinion

Anti-Western sentiment
Boxer Rebellion
Chinese slang
Cantonese words and phrases
Culture of Hong Kong
Pejorative terms for European people
Racism in China
Xenophobia in Asia